Sahily Diago Mesa (born 26 August 1995 in Jovellanos, Matanzas) is a Cuban middle-distance runner.

She competed for Cuba at the 2012 Summer Olympics as member of the 4×400 metres relay squad. She competed at the 2020 Summer Olympics.

Personal bests

International competitions

References

External links

1995 births
Living people
Cuban female sprinters
Place of birth missing (living people)
Athletes (track and field) at the 2016 Summer Olympics
Olympic athletes of Cuba
Athletes (track and field) at the 2020 Summer Olympics
People from Matanzas Province
21st-century Cuban women